Cornell Law School is the law school of Cornell University, a private Ivy League university in Ithaca, New York. One of the five Ivy League law schools, it offers four law degree programs, JD, LLM, MSLS and JSD, along with several dual-degree programs in conjunction with other professional schools at the university. Established in 1887 as Cornell's Department of Law, the school today is one of the smallest top-tier JD-conferring institutions in the country, with around 200 students graduating each year. Cornell Law School has consistently ranked within the top tier of American legal institutions, known as the T14.

Cornell Law alumni include business executive and philanthropist Myron Charles Taylor, namesake of the law school building, along with U.S. Secretaries of State Edmund Muskie and William P. Rogers, U.S. Secretary of Housing and Urban Development Samuel Pierce, the first female President of Taiwan, Tsai Ing-wen, federal judge and first female editor-in-chief of a law review Mary H. Donlon, former President of the International Criminal Court Song Sang-Hyun, as well as many members of the U.S. Congress, governors, state attorneys general, U.S. federal and state judges, diplomats and businesspeople.

Cornell Law School is home to the Legal Information Institute (LII), the Journal of Empirical Legal Studies, the Cornell Law Review, the Cornell Journal of Law and Public Policy and the Cornell International Law Journal.

History

The Law Department at Cornell opened in 1887 in Morrill Hall with Judge Douglass Boardman as its first dean. At that time, admission did not require even a high school diploma. In 1917, two years of undergraduate education were required for admission, and in 1924, it became a graduate degree program. The department was renamed the Cornell Law School in 1925. In 1890, George Washington Fields graduated, one of the first law-school-graduates of color in the United States. In 1893, Cornell had its first female graduate, Mary Kennedy Brown. Future Governor, Secretary of State, and Chief Justice of the United States, Charles Evans Hughes, was a professor of law at Cornell from 1891 to 1893, and after returning to legal practice he continued to teach at the law school as a special lecturer from 1893 to 1895.  Hughes Hall, one of the law school's central buildings, is named in his honor.

In 1892, the school moved into Boardman Hall, which was constructed specifically for legal instruction. The school moved from Boardman Hall (now the site of Olin Library) to its present-day location at Myron Taylor Hall in 1937. The law school building, an ornate, Gothic structure, was the result of a donation by Myron Charles Taylor, a former CEO of US Steel, and a member of the Cornell Law class of 1894. Hughes Hall was built as an addition to Myron Taylor Hall and completed in 1963.  It was also funded by a gift from Taylor. Another addition to Myron Taylor Hall, the Jane M.G. Foster wing, was completed in 1988 and added more space to the library. Foster was a member of the class of 1918, an editor of the Cornell Law Review (then Cornell Law Quarterly), and an Order of the Coif graduate. In June 2012 the school embarked on a three-year, multi-phase expansion and renovation. The first phase created additional classroom space underground, adjacent to Myron Taylor Hall along College Avenue. The second phase will include the removal and digitization of printed materials from the library stacks so that the space can be converted to additional classroom and student space. The third phase involves converting Hughes Hall into office space.

In 1948, Cornell Law School established a program of specialization in international affairs and also started awarding LL.B. degrees.  In 1968, the school began to publish the Cornell International Law Journal. In 1991, the school established the Berger International Legal Studies Program. In 1994, the school established a partnership with the University of Paris I law faculty to establish a Paris-based Summer Institute of International and Comparative Law. From 1999 to 2004 the school hosted the Feminism and Legal Theory Project. In 2006, the school established its second summer law institute in Suzhou, China. The Clarke Program in East Asian Law and Culture was established in 2002.

Myron Taylor Hall saw the addition of 40,000 square feet of underground classrooms in 2012–2014. Hughes Hall was renovated in 2017.

Admissions

Cornell Law School is extremely selective: the median LSAT for the 2022 entering class was 172 (98th percentile of all test takers), with 25th and 75th percentiles of 170 (97th percentile of all test takers) and 174 (99th percentile of all test takers). The median undergraduate GPA was 3.87, with 25th and 75th percentiles of 3.76 and 3.94, respectively.

For the 2021 LL.M. program, which is designed for non-U.S.-trained lawyers, 900 applications were received for the 50 to 60 openings. LL.M. students come from over 30 different countries.

Along with consideration of the quality of an applicant's academic record and LSAT scores, the full-file-review admissions process places a heavy emphasis on an applicant's personal statement, letters of recommendation, community/extracurricular involvement, and work experience. The application also invites a statement on diversity and a short note on why an applicant particularly wants to attend Cornell. The law school values applicants who have done their research and have particular interests or goals that would be served by attending the school versus one of its peer institutions.

Reputation
Cornell Law School was ranked 12th in the 2023 U.S. News & World Report Law School rankings and 3rd in the 2022 Above the Law rankings, which prioritizes career outcomes above all other factors. The Master of Laws (LLM) program at Cornell Law School was ranked 1st in the 2006, 2008, 2010, and 2011 AUAP rankings. Cornell Law is known for its large firm prowess, placing a greater portion of its J.D. graduates at big law firms than any other law school in the United States. On the public service front, Cornell Law is known for the Cornell Law Death Penalty Project, its Tenants Advocacy Practicum, and for housing the Legal Information Institute, a non-profit, public service of Cornell Law School that provides no-cost access to current American and international legal research sources online at law.cornell.edu, serving over 40 million unique visitors per year.

Academics

Cornell has offered LL.M and J.S.D degrees since 1928. The joint JD/MBA (with Cornell's Johnson School of Management) has three- and four-year tracks, the JD/MILR program is four years, the JD/MPA is four years, and JD/MRP is four years.

In addition, Cornell has joint program arrangements with universities abroad to prepare students for international licensure:

 Joint program with University of Paris (La Sorbonne) (JD/Master en Droit)
 Joint program with Humboldt University of Berlin (JD/M.LL.P)
 Joint program with Institut d’Études Politiques de Paris (JD/Master in Global Business Law)

The JD/Master en Droit lasts four years and prepares graduates for admission to the bar in the United States and in France. The JD/M.LL.P is three years and conveys a mastery of German and European law and practices. The JD/Master in Global Business Law lasts three years. 

Cornell Law School runs two summer institutes overseas, providing Cornell Law students with unique opportunities to engage in rigorous international legal studies.  The Cornell-Université de Paris I Summer Institute of International and Comparative Law at the Sorbonne in Paris, France offers a diverse curriculum in the historic Sorbonne and Centre Panthéon (Faculté de droit) buildings at the heart of the University of Paris I: Panthéon-Sorbonne.  Coursework includes international human rights, comparative legal systems, and international commercial arbitration.  French language classes are also offered.

In 2006, Cornell Law School announced that it would launch a second summer law institute, the new Workshop in International Business Transactions with Chinese Characteristics in Suzhou, China.  In partnership with Bucerius Law School (Germany) and Kenneth Wang School of Law at Soochow University (China), Cornell Law provides students from the United States, Europe, and China with an academic forum in which they can collaborate on an international business problem.

Employment
Approximately 92% of the Class of 2021 obtained full-time, long-term, JD-required employment within nine months of graduation. According to Reuters, Cornell Law placed a greater portion of its 2021 graduates in associate positions at big law firms than any other law school in the United States. Of the graduating class of 2021, 76% were employed at large firms with more than 250 attorneys, and 71% were employed at firms with more than 500 attorneys. In total, approximately 80% of that class obtained elite employment outcomes in the form of federal clerkships or employment at firms with more than 250 attorneys. In a comparative survey of all law schools, Cornell graduates earned the highest average salaries in the United States from 2014 through 2019, with a mean salary of over $183,000. In 2021, Law.com ranked Cornell Law #3 on its ranking of the 50 best law schools for getting an associate position at the largest 100 law firms in the country.

Costs
The 2021-2022 non-discounted tuition for the JD program was $71,522 per year. The total cost of attendance (indicating the cost of tuition, fees, and living expenses) at Cornell Law School for the 2021-2022 academic year was $95,114, bringing the total non-discounted cost of attendance for the three-year program to $285,242.  According to Cornell Law's 2021 509 ABA disclosures, 83% of its 578 students received grants or scholarships.

Initiatives

Legal Information Institute
Cornell Law also is home to the Legal Information Institute (LII), an online provider of public legal information. Started in 1992, it was the first law site developed for the internet. The LII offers all opinions of the United States Supreme Court handed down since 1990, together with over 600 earlier decisions selected for their historic importance. The LII also publishes over a decade of opinions of the New York Court of Appeals, the full United States Code, the UCC, and the Code of Federal Regulations among other resources.

It recently created Wex, a free wiki legal dictionary and encyclopedia, collaboratively created by legal experts. And the LII Supreme Court Bulletin is a free email- and web-based publication that intends to serve subscribers with thorough, yet understandable, legal analysis of upcoming Court cases as well as timely email notification of Court decisions.

Publications
The school has three law journals that are student-edited: the Cornell Law Review, the Cornell International Law Journal, and the Cornell Journal of Law and Public Policy.  Additionally, the Journal of Empirical Legal Studies is a peer-reviewed journal that is published by Cornell Law faculty.

Moot Court
Cornell Law students actively participate in myriad moot court competitions annually, both in the law school itself and in external and international competitions.  The Langfan First-Year Moot Court Competition, which takes place every spring, traditionally draws a large majority of the first-year class.  Other internal competitions include the Cuccia Cup and the Rossi Cup.

Institutes and Programs
 Berger International Legal Studies Program
 Clarke Business Law Institute
 Clarke Center for International and Comparative Legal Studies
 Clarke Initiative for Law and Development in the Middle East and North Africa
 Clarke Program on Corporations and Society
 Clarke Program in East Asian Law and Culture
 Death Penalty Project
 Empirical Legal Studies: Judicial Statistics Project
 Global Center for Women and Justice
 Graduate Legal Studies Program
 ILR-Law School Program on Conflict Resolution
 International Comparative Programs
 Law and Economics Program
 Lay Participation in Law International Research Collaborative
 Migration and Human Rights Program

Summer School with Paris 1 Pantheon-Sorbonne University 

Cornell University holds since 1993 the "Cornell Law School-Université Paris I Panthéon-Sorbonne Summer Institute of Comparative and International Law".

Campus
Cornell Law is housed within Myron Taylor Hall (erected 1932), which contains the Law Library, classrooms, offices, a moot court room, and the Cornell Legal Aid Clinic.

Library

The law library contains 700,000 books and microforms and includes rare historical texts relevant to the legal history of the United States. The library is one of the 12 national depositories for print records of briefs filed with the United States Supreme Court. Also, there is a large collection of print copies of the records and briefs of the New York Court of Appeals. The large microfilm collection has sets of Congressional, Supreme Court, and United Nations documents, as well as a large collection of World Law Reform commission materials. Microfiche records and briefs for the United States Supreme Court, the United States Court of Appeals for the Second Circuit and D.C. Circuit, and the New York State Court of Appeals are also collected. The library also has a large collection of international, foreign, and comparative law, with the main focus being on the Commonwealth of Nations and Europe. Along with this, there are also collections of public international law and international trade law. A new initiative by the library is to collect Chinese, Japanese, and Korean resources to support the law school's Clarke Program in East Asian Law and Culture.

Rare books in the library include the Samuel Thorne collection, which has 175 of some of the earliest and most rare books on law. Other significant collections include the Nathaniel C. Moak library and the Edwin J. Marshall Collection of early works on equity and the Earl J. Bennett Collection of Statutory Material, a print collection of original colonial, territorial, and state session laws and statutory codes. Among the library's special collections are 19th Century Trials Collection, Donovan Nuremberg Trials Collection, Scottsboro Collection, William P. and Adele Langston Rogers Collection and the Chile Declassification Project.

People

Faculty

 Gregory S. Alexander, Property Law and Theory
 Cynthia Grant Bowman, Gender Equality, Women's Rights, Feminist Jurisprudence
 Michael C. Dorf, Constitutional Law (and noted legal blogger)
 William A. Jacobson
 Eduardo Peñalver, Property and Land Use
 Annelise Riles, Comparative Law, International Law, Legal Anthropology
 Stewart J. Schwab, Employment Law
 Emily Sherwin, Jurisprudence, Property, and Remedies
 Lynn Stout, Professor of Corporate Law, Securities Regulation, Law and Economics (2012–2018)
 Robert S. Summers, Professor of Contract and Commercial Law (1969–2011)
 Stephen Yale-Loehr, Immigration Law

Notable alumni

Political
 John G. Alexander (1916), United States Representative for Minnesota's 3rd congressional district (1939–1941)
 Rob Andrews (1982), United States Representative for New Jersey's 1st congressional district (1990–2014)
 Michael Atkinson (1991), Inspector General of the Intelligence Community (2018–2020)
 Mark J. Bennett (1979), served as Attorney General of Hawaii
 Arnold Burns (1953), served as United States Deputy Attorney General
 Thomas Carmody (1882), served as Attorney General of New York
 Katherine Clark (1989), United States Representative for Massachusetts's 5th congressional district (2013–present)
 Barber Conable (1948), United States Representative for New York's 30th congressional district (1983–1985), President of the World Bank (1986–1991)
 Constance E. Cook (1943), member of the New York State Assembly who in 1970 coauthored the first legislation that legalized abortion
 Sharice Davids (2010), United States Representative for Kansas's 3rd congressional district (2019–present)
 Carlos Mendoza Davis (LLM 1995), Governor of Baja California Sur state in Mexico
 Arthur Hobson Dean (1923), diplomat, chief U.S. negotiator of the Korean Armistice Agreement, which ended the Korean War, drafter of the Nuclear Test Ban Treaty, and delegate to the United Nations
 Anna Dolidze (JSD 2013), chief legal adviser to the President of Georgia, appointed to the High Council of Justice
 Juan Carlos Esguerra (LLM 1973), former Ambassador of Colombia to the United States, former Colombian Minister of Justice and Law
 Reuben L. Haskell (1898), United States Representative for New York's 10th congressional district (1915–1919)
 William vanden Heuvel (1952), diplomat, businessman, and author
 Philip H. Hoff (1951), 73rd Governor of Vermont (1963–1969)
 Frank Horton (1947), United States Representative for New York's 36th congressional district (1963–1973), 34th district (1973–1983), and 29th district (1983–1993)
 Charles Samuel Joelson (1939), United States Representative for New Jersey's 8th congressional district (1961–1969)
 Frances Kellor (1897), advisor to Theodore Roosevelt and the Progressive Party (United States, 1912), early scholar of urban poverty, unemployment and crime, and advocate for education and immigration reform
 Huang Kuo-chang (JSD 2006), Taiwanese politician, activist, legal scholar, researcher and writer
 Norman F. Lent (1957), United States Representative for New York's 4th congressional district (1973–1993)
 Leonard Leo (1989), Executive Vice President of the Federalist Society
 Sol Linowitz (1938), United States Ambassador to the Organization of American States, received the Presidential Medal of Freedom in 1998
 Quinton Lucas (2009), 55th Mayor of Kansas City, Missouri
 William J. Lynn III (1980), United States Deputy Secretary of Defense
 Gordon MacDonald (1994), Attorney General of New Hampshire
 John T. Morrison (1890), 6th Governor of Idaho
 Edmund Muskie (1939), 64th Governor of Maine, U.S. Senator, U.S. Secretary of State, received the Presidential Medal of Freedom in 1981
 Kotaro Nagasaki (1994), member of the House of Representatives in the Diet.
 Edward R. O'Malley (1891), served as Attorney General of New York
 Edward Worthington Pattison (1957), United States Representative for New York's 29th congressional district (1975–1979)
 Peter N. Perretti Jr. (1956), served as Attorney General of New Jersey
 Philip Perry (1990), former general counsel of the United States Department of Homeland Security and former general counsel for the Office of Management and Budget
 Samuel Pierce (1949), served as U.S. Secretary of Housing and Urban Development
 John Raymond Pillion (1927), United States Representative for New York's 42nd congressional district (1953–1965)
 Alexander Pirnie (1926), United States Representative for New York's 34th congressional district (1959–1963) and 32nd district (1963–1973), awarded the Legion of Merit and Bronze Star Medal for service in Europe during World War II
 Michael Punke (1989), United States Ambassador to the World Trade Organization (2010–2017)
 Clarence D. Rappleyea Jr. (1962), Minority Leader of the New York State Assembly (1982–1995)
 Thomas Richards (1972), Mayor of Rochester, New York
 Howard W. Robison (1939), United States Representative for New York's 39th congressional district (1958–1975)
 William P. Rogers (1937), served as U.S. Attorney General, and as U.S. Secretary of State, received the Presidential Medal of Freedom in 1973
 Laxmi Mall Singhvi (JSD 1955), served as High Commissioner of India to the United Kingdom (1991–1997)
 William Sorrell (1974), Vermont Attorney General (1997–2017)
 Henry P. Smith (1936), United States Representative for New York's 40th congressional district (1965–1973)
 Michael E. Toner (1992), former chair of the Federal Election Commission and chief counsel for the Republican National Committee
 Martín Travieso (1903), served as provisional Governor of Puerto Rico, a member of the first Senate of Puerto Rico, Mayor of San Juan, and Associate and Chief Justice of the Supreme Court of Puerto Rico
 Tsai Ing-wen (LLM 1980), first woman elected President of Taiwan (2016–present)
 Jan van Zanen (LLM 1984), Mayor of The Hague (2020–present)

Federal Judiciary
 Simon L. Adler (1889), United States District Court for the Western District of New York (1928–1934)
 Mark J. Bennett (1979), United States Court of Appeals for the Ninth Circuit (2018–present)
 Frederic Block (1959), United States District Court for the Eastern District of New York (1994–2005)
 Robert Boochever (1941), United States Court of Appeals for the Ninth Circuit (1980–1986)
 Leonie Brinkema (1976), United States District Court for the Eastern District of Virginia (1993–present)
 John M. Cashin (1915), United States District Court for the Southern District of New York (1955–1970)
 John H. Chun (1994), United States District Court for the Western District of Washington (2022-present)
 Albert Wheeler Coffrin (1947), United States District Court for the District of Vermont (1972–1993), Chief Judge of the District of Vermont from 1983 to 1988
 Brian Cogan (1979), United States District Court for the Eastern District of New York (2006–present)
 Alfred Conkling Coxe Jr. (1903), United States District Court for the Southern District of New York (1929–1957)
 Paul A. Crotty (1967), United States District Court for the Southern District of New York (2005–present)
 Mary H. Donlon (1920), United States Customs Court (now the United States Court of International Trade) (1955-1977)
 Phillip S. Figa (1976), United States District Court for the District of Colorado (2003–2008)
 Peter W. Hall (1977), United States Court of Appeals for the Second Circuit (2004–2021)
 Robert Dixon Herman (1938), United States District Court for the Middle District of Pennsylvania (1969–1990)
 Frederick Bernard Lacey (1948), United States District Court for the District of New Jersey (1971–1986)
 Lloyd Francis MacMahon (1938), United States District Court for the Southern District of New York (1959–1989), Chief Judge of the Southern District of New York from 1980 to 1982
 Anne M. Nardacci (2002), United States District Court for the Northern District of New York (2022-present)
 Alison J. Nathan (2000), United States Court of Appeals for the Second Circuit (2022–present)
 Pamela Pepper (1989), United States District Court for the Eastern District of Wisconsin (2014–present)
 Hernan Gregorio Pesquera (1948), United States District Court for the District of Puerto Rico (1972–1982), Chief Judge of the District of Puerto Rico from 1980 to 1982
 Aubrey Eugene Robinson (1947), United States District Court for the District of Columbia (1966–2000), Chief Judge of the District of Columbia from 1982 to 1992
 Stephen C. Robinson (1984), United States District Court for the Southern District of New York (2003–2010)
 Shira Scheindlin (1975), United States District Court for the Southern District of New York (1994–2012)
 Karen Gren Scholer (1982), United States District Court for the Northern District of Texas (2018–present)
 Gary L. Sharpe (1974), United States District Court for the Northern District of New York (2004–present), Chief Judge of the Northern District of New York from 2011–present
 Amy J. St. Eve (1990), United States Court of Appeals for the Seventh Circuit (2018–present)
 Roger Gordon Strand (1961), United States District Court for the District of Arizona (1985–2000)
 Joseph L. Tauro (1956), United States District Court for the District of Massachusetts (1972–2013), Chief Judge of the District of Massachusetts from 1992 to 1999
 Elbert Parr Tuttle (1923), one of the "Fifth Circuit Four," United States Court of Appeals for the Fifth Circuit (1954–1981), United States Court of Appeals for the Eleventh Circuit (1981–1996), and Chief Judge of the Fifth Circuit from 1960 to 1967.  Tuttle received the Presidential Medal of Freedom in 1981 and the courthouse for the United States Court of Appeals for the Eleventh Circuit is named in his honor.
 Ellsworth Van Graafeiland (1940), United States Court of Appeals for the Second Circuit (1974–2004)
 Richard C. Wesley (1974), United States Court of Appeals for the Second Circuit (2003–present)
 Christy C. Wiegand (2000), United States District Court for the Western District of Pennsylvania (2020–present)
 Thomas Samuel Zilly (1962), United States District Court for the Western District of Washington (1988–2004)

State Judiciary
 Barry T. Albin (1976), Associate Justice of the Supreme Court of New Jersey (2002–present)
 Robert Boochever (1941), Associate Justice of the Supreme Court of Alaska (1972–1980), Chief Justice of the Supreme Court of Alaska from 1975 to 1978
 Albert M. Crampton (1922), Justice of the Supreme Court of Illinois (1948–1953)
 Howard H. Dana Jr. (1966), Associate Justice of the Maine Supreme Judicial Court (1993–2007)
 Rowland L. Davis (1897), Associate Justice of the New York Supreme Court, Appellate Division, Fourth Department (1921–1926), Third Department (1926–1931), and Second Department (1931–1939)
 Ellen Gorman (1982), Associate Justice of the Maine Supreme Judicial Court (2007–present)
 Stewart F. Hancock Jr. (1950), Associate Judge of the New York Court of Appeals (1986–1993)
 Irving G. Hubbs (1891), Associate Judge of the New York Court of Appeals (1929–1939)
 Anthony T. Kane (1969), Associate Justice of the New York Supreme Court, Appellate Division, Third Department (2002–2009)
 Gordon MacDonald (1994), Chief Justice of the Supreme Court of New Hampshire (2021- )
 Louis W. Marcus (1889), Justice of the New York Supreme Court (1905-1923)
 Anne M. Patterson (1983), Associate Justice of the Supreme Court of New Jersey (2011–present)
 Cuthbert W. Pound (1887), Associate Judge of the New York Court of Appeals (1915–1934), Chief Judge of the New York Court of Appeals from 1932 to 1934
 Phillip Rapoza (1976), Chief Justice of the Massachusetts Appeals Court (2006–2015), Associate Justice of the Massachusetts Appeals Court (1998–2006)
 Roberto A. Rivera-Soto (1977), Associate Justice of the Supreme Court of New Jersey (2004–2011)
 Robert M. Sohngen (1908), Justice of the Supreme Court of Ohio (1947–1948)
 Harry Taylor (1893), Associate Justice of the New York Supreme Court, Appellate Division, Fourth Department (1924–1936)
 Joseph Weintraub (1930), Chief Justice of the Supreme Court of New Jersey (1957–1973), Associate Justice of the Supreme Court of New Jersey (1956–1957)
 Richard C. Wesley (1974), Associate Judge of the New York Court of Appeals (1997–2003)
 Paul Yesawich (1951), Associate Justice of the New York Supreme Court, Appellate Division, First Department (1974–1981), Third Department (1981–1999)

International Judiciary
 Song Sang-Hyun (JSD 1970), Judge of the International Criminal Court (2003–2015), President of the International Criminal Court from 2009 to 2015

Law and Business
 J. Carter Bacot (1958), former President and CEO of the Bank of New York
 Paul Batista (1974), trial lawyer and author of the leading treatise on civil RICO
 Mary H. Donlon (1920), first woman editor-in-chief of a US law review and first woman to become a partner of a Wall Street law firm
 Milton S. Gould (1933), founding partner of Shea & Gould.  The Milton Gould Award for Outstanding Advocacy is named in his honor.
 Gitanjali Gutierrez (2001), first lawyer to meet with a detainee at Guantanamo Bay, Information Commissioner for Bermuda
 Marc Kasowitz (1977), founding partner of Kasowitz Benson Torres
 Frances Kellor (1897), founding member of the American Arbitration Association and expert in international arbitration
 Ron Kuby (1983), criminal and civil rights lawyer, counsel on cases such as Texas v. Johnson
 Gail Laughlin (1898), first woman from Maine to practice law and founder of the National League for Women's Service
 William F. Lee (1976), intellectual property lawyer, co-managing partner of WilmerHale, first Asian-American to lead a major US law firm
 Samuel Leibowitz (1915), criminal and civil rights lawyer, represented The Scottsboro Boys and argued Norris v. Alabama. The Samuel Leibowitz Professorship was endowed in his honor.
 Sol Linowitz (1938), Chairman of Xerox, received the Presidential Medal of Freedom in 1998
 Teddy Mayer (1962), co-founder and manager of McLaren Racing
 Shannon Minter (1993), civil rights attorney
 Frank Rosenfelt (1950), former CEO of Metro-Goldwyn-Mayer (MGM) Studio and recipient of the Purple Heart for injuries sustained at the Battle of the Bulge
 Jan Schlichtmann (1977), environmental and toxic tort attorney, lead plaintiffs' lawyer in Anderson v. Cryovac, Inc., subject of the book A Civil Action by Jonathan Harr and the film of the same name, in which Schlichtmann was portrayed by John Travolta.
 Harry Taylor (1893), provided the legal advice that elevated the American League to major league status as a rival to the National League, Taylor financed his legal education by playing professional baseball with the Louisville Colonels
 Myron Charles Taylor (1894), CEO of U.S. Steel
 Tejshree Thapa (1993), human rights attorney, developed legal argument for prosecuting rape as a crime against humanity before the ICTY
 Justin DuPratt White (1890), founding partner of White & Case.  The J. DuPratt White Professorship was endowed in his honor.
 Robert D. Ziff (1992), former co-CEO of Ziff Brothers Investments

Academia
 Jessica Berg (1994), Dean and Tom J.E. and Bette Lou Walker Professor of Law, Case Western School of Law, Professor of Bioethics and Population and Quantitative Health Sciences at the Case Western School of Medicine
 Edward J. Bloustein (1959), former President of Rutgers University
 Hannah Buxbaum (1992), John E. Schiller Chair in Legal Ethics at Indiana University Maurer School of Law
 Richard Buxbaum (1952), Jackson H. Ralston Professor of International Law at UC Berkeley School of Law
 Terry Calvani (1972), former Professor of Antitrust Law at Vanderbilt University Law School, FTC Commissioner, and Member of the Competition Authority (Ireland)
 Dan T. Coenen (1978), University Professor and Harmon W. Caldwell Chair in Constitutional Law at the University of Georgia Law School
 Anna Dolidze (JSD 2013), Professor of International Law at the University of Western Ontario
 Marc A. Franklin (1956), Frederick I. Richman Professor of Law at Stanford Law School
 Charles Garside (1923), former President of the State University of New York
 Michael Goldsmith (1975), Woodruff J. Deem Professor of Law at Brigham Young University's J. Reuben Clark Law School
 William B. Gould IV (1961), Charles A. Beardsley Professor of Law at Stanford Law School
 Ernest Huffcut (1888), Professor of Law at Indiana University School of Law
 Julie O'Sullivan (1984), Agnes Williams Sesquicentennial Professor of Law at Georgetown University Law Center
 John W. Reed (1942), Thomas M. Cooley Professor of Law at the University of Michigan Law School
 Ruth Roemer (1939), Professor at the UCLA Fielding School of Public Health.  The Ruth Roemer Social Justice Leadership Award is named in her honor.
 R. Smith Simpson (1931), co-creator with Peter F. Krogh of the Institute for the Study of Diplomacy at Georgetown University's Edmund A. Walsh School of Foreign Service

Other
 Kissi Agyebeng (LLM 2006), Special Prosecutor of Ghana
 George Bell Jr. (1894), United States Army Major General who commanded the 33rd Infantry Division in World War I and later the United States VI Corps. Bell was awarded the Distinguished Service Medal, the French Croix de Guerre with Palm and the Legion of Honor, as well as appointment as a Knight Commander of Britain's Order of St. Michael and St. George.
 Bob DuPuy (1973), former President of Major League Baseball
 Harold O. Levy (1977), Executive Director of the Jack Kent Cooke Foundation and former Chancellor of New York City Schools
 Bajrakitiyabha Mahidol (LLM 2002, JSD 2005), Princess of Thailand
 Ari Melber (2009), journalist, chief legal correspondent for MSNBC, and host of The Beat with Ari Melber
 Pablo Morales (1994), gold medalist at the 1992 Summer Olympics, and former world-record holder in the 100 metres butterfly
 Rick Olczyk (1996), Assistant general manager of the Carolina Hurricanes
 Michael Punke (1989), author of The Revenant: A Novel of Revenge, which was the basis for the film The Revenant
 Glenn Scobey Warner (1894), legendary football coach and innovator
 Paul Yesawich (1951), played in five NBA games for the Syracuse Nationals

Fictional
 Irene Menéndez Hastings, in The Secret in Their Eyes, received her law degree from Cornell
 Norman Mushari, according to God Bless You, Mr. Rosewater, graduated "from Cornell Law School at the top of his class"
 Ling Woo, on Ally McBeal, was an editor of the Cornell Law Review

See also

 Law of New York (state)

References

External links

Law School
Law School
Educational institutions established in 1887
Law schools in New York (state)
1887 establishments in New York (state)
Ivy League law schools